Ahmadabad-e Olya (also Romanized as Aḩmadābād-e ‘Olyā; also known as Aḩmadābād-e Bālā) is a village in Abarghan Rural District, in the Central District of Sarab County, East Azerbaijan Province, Iran. At the 2006 census, its population was 15, in 4 families.

References 

Populated places in Sarab County